Shawna Patricia Grosskopf (born February 27, 1950) is an American economist who is Professor Emerita at Oregon State University in Corvallis, Oregon, United States, and Adjunct Professor at the Centre for Environmental and Resource Economics in Umeå, Sweden. She was named one of the 250 most-cited scholars in economics and finance by the ISI Web of Knowledge in 2005.

References

External links

American women economists
Living people
1950 births
Economists from Michigan
People from Detroit
Oregon State University faculty
Syracuse University alumni
21st-century American economists
21st-century American women